Bailadores is a town in the western part of the Mérida State of Venezuela and is the capital of the Rivas Dávila Municipality.

History
It was founded by Captain Luis Martín Martín, September 14, 1601, by appointment of founder Peter Sandes Court, from the Real Audiencia de Santa Fe de Bogotá.

Notable people
Guillermo Davila, actor and singer

Cities in Mérida (state)
Populated places established in 1601